Doughty House may refer to:

in the United Kingdom
Doughty House, Richmond, London

in the United States
George V. Doughty House and Garage, Jerome County, Idaho
Doughty House (Mount Pleasant, Michigan)
John Doughty House, Absecon City, New Jersey, listed on the National Register of Historic Places